Mrs. Brown's Boys is a British-Irish television sitcom created by and starring Irish writer and performer Brendan O'Carroll and produced in the United Kingdom by BBC Scotland in partnership with BocPix and RTÉ. O'Carroll himself plays his drag persona, Agnes Brown, with several close friends and family members making up the rest of the cast. The show adopts an informal production style where production mistakes and tomfoolery, mostly instigated by O'Carroll, are edited into each episode. Despite being lambasted by critics, the show has become a ratings success in both Ireland, where it is set, and Britain, where it is recorded. It is also gaining increasingly higher ratings in Australia and Canada. The show has won numerous awards.

It debuted on RTÉ One in Ireland on 1 January 2011 and on BBC One in the United Kingdom on 21 February 2011.

Series overview

Episodes

Series 1 (2011)
This 2009 unaired pilot episode of Mrs. Brown's Boys, titled "Dermot's Dilemma", follows the storyline of the first aired episode of the series, "The Mammy". However, there are some noticeable character and dialogue differences within the pilot. The unaired pilot was later released with the Series 1 DVD.

Series 2 (2012)

Series 3 (2013)

Annual specials (2013–present)

References

Episodes
Mrs Brown's Boys
Mrs Brown's Boys